Benjamín Clariond Reyes-Retana is a Mexican politician affiliated with the Institutional Revolutionary Party (PRI) who has served as federal deputy, municipal president (mayor) of Monterrey and as interim governor of the State of Nuevo León after the destitution of Sócrates Rizzo.

In 2006 he ran for municipal president (mayor) of San Pedro Garza García losing against the PAN candidate Fernando Margáin.

Clariond is the grandson of French immigrant Jacques Antoine Clariond (also known as "Santiago Antonio Clariond") founder of Industrias Monterrey. He has served as general director of IMSATEC.

References

http://sitl.diputados.gob.mx/LXI_leg/curricula.php?dipt=365 (in Spanish)

Living people
Institutional Revolutionary Party politicians
Members of the Chamber of Deputies (Mexico)
Politicians from Monterrey
Municipal presidents of Monterrey
Governors of Nuevo León
Mexican people of French descent
21st-century Mexican politicians
Monterrey Institute of Technology and Higher Education alumni
Year of birth missing (living people)
20th-century Mexican politicians